is a station on the Tokyo Monorail in Ōta, Tokyo, Japan.

Lines
Only all-stations "Local" services stop at this station.

Station layout
The station has two elevated platforms serving two tracks. Both platforms are connected by stairways with ticket gates on the street level.

Adjacent stations

History
It was renamed simply Seibijō Station on 27 September 1993.

Passenger statistics
In fiscal 2011, the station was used by an average of 2,329 passengers daily.

Surrounding area
The station is placed near the maintenance facilities of Haneda Airport.

References

External links

 Tokyo Monorail station information 

Tokyo Monorail Haneda Line
Stations of Tokyo Monorail
Railway stations in Tokyo
Railway stations in Japan opened in 1967